The 2000 Malaysian motorcycle Grand Prix was the second round of the 2000 Grand Prix motorcycle racing season. It took place on 2 April 2000 at the Sepang International Circuit.

500cc race report
The race was won by Kenny Roberts Jr., after he had already qualified for pole position on Saturday.

At the start, Kenny Roberts Jr. lost ground to the Yamaha's of Carlos Checa and Norick Abe, with Loris Capirossi also making up ground to go up into third place, with Valentino Rossi right behind in 4th place. Kenny Roberts Jr. dropped down to 11th position.

After a few corners, both Àlex Crivillé and Capirossi fell and retired on the opening lap. Capirossi highsighted whilst accelerating out of the corner, taking out Crivillé in the process and almost taking out Roberts as well.

On lap 2, Roberts had moved up into 6th position, thanks to the crash from both Capirossi and Crivillé

On lap 3, Norick Abe crashed out of the race. He lowsided when coming out of corner 9 and slid into the grass.

On lap 4, Checa still led, with Rossi in second, McCoy in third, Roberts in 4th and Max Biaggi in 5th place. Rossi also crashed out of the race at turn 1, making this his second retirement of the season. He lost the front end, highsighted and slid into the grass with his Honda.

After a few laps, Roberts overtook McCoy and went up into second place, after Rossi retired. Checa still led the race, but Roberts' Suzuki was now closing in on the Yamaha of Checa with 14 laps to go.

On lap 7, Roberts overtook Checa to take a lead he would never surrender. 

On lap 11, McCoy overtook Biaggi for third place after Biaggi ran wide on the first corner. He tried to gain it back, but ultimately conceded.

On lap 15, Roberts waved his hand, indicating that it was raining. The race was red-flagged, Roberts won and full points were given because two-thirds of the race distance was traversed by the riders.

500 cc classification

250 cc classification

125 cc classification

Championship standings after the race (500cc)

Below are the standings for the top five riders and constructors after round two has concluded. 

Riders' Championship standings

Constructors' Championship standings

 Note: Only the top five positions are included for both sets of standings.

References

Malaysian motorcycle Grand Prix
Malaysia
Motorcycle Grand Prix
Malaysian motorcycle Grand Prix